Person–McGhee Farm is a historic farm complex located at 5631 U.S. Highway 1 in Franklinton, Franklin County, North Carolina, about 4 miles (6 kilometers) north of town.  The earliest section of the house was built sometime between 1770 and 1820, and is a three-bay, two-story frame dwelling over a stone-walled cellar.  It has double shouldered brick end chimneys.  In the 1890s, a large 2 1/2-story Queen Anne / Colonial Revival style section was added to the original Federal period dwelling.  Also on the property are the contributing tenant house (1860s-1870s), a water tower, smokehouse, cattle barn, three log tobacco barns, and several sheds.

The farm was threatened during a wildfire which occurred on February 10, 2008.  Two old sheds were destroyed, but the rest of the property was able to be saved.

It was listed on the National Register of Historic Places in 1979.

References

Farms on the National Register of Historic Places in North Carolina
Houses completed in 1800
Buildings and structures in Franklin County, North Carolina
National Register of Historic Places in Franklin County, North Carolina
Houses in Franklin County, North Carolina